The 1990 Calabrian regional election took place on 6 and 7 May 1990.

Events
Christian Democracy, which had been the leading political force in the region for twenty years, was the largest party, while the Italian Socialist Party, which controlled the post of President of the Region since 1980, made strong gains and came second at the expenses of the Italian Communist Party.

After the election, a new government composed of the Christian Democrats, the Socialists, the Italian Democratic Socialist Party and the Italian Republican Party was formed under the leadership of Rosario Olivo, the incumbent Socialist President (Organic Centre-left). A Christian Democrat, Rhodio, took the leadership in 1992.

Results 

Source: Ministry of the Interior

Elections in Calabria
1990 elections in Italy